Farthing is a defunct British science fiction magazine. The magazine was published between 2005 and 2007. It was based in London. Wendy Bradley was both the publisher and editor of the magazine.

References

External links

2005 establishments in the United Kingdom
2007 disestablishments in the United Kingdom
Defunct science fiction magazines published in the United Kingdom
Magazines published in London
Magazines established in 2005
Magazines disestablished in 2007